Carlos Morfín (born 28 May 1949) is a Mexican water polo player. He competed in the men's tournament at the 1968 Summer Olympics. He was also a member of the bronze medal winning team at the 1967 Pan American Games.

References

External links
 

1949 births
Living people
Mexican male water polo players
Olympic water polo players of Mexico
Water polo players at the 1968 Summer Olympics
1967 Pan American Games
Sportspeople from Mexico City
20th-century Mexican people